Live in Helsinki is the first official live album by Italian band Zu, recorded in Helsinki during the 2002 Europe tour and released in 2003 by the then fledgling label Tang Plastik Records.

Track list
 The Elusive Character Of Victory 5:27
 Solar Anus 2:50
 Testa Di Cane 5:08
 Asmodeo 2:59
 La Grande Madre Delle Bestie 5:25
 Erotomane 3:35
 Arbol De La Esperanza Mantente Firme 4:45
 Eli, Eli, Eli 2:29
 Epidurale 8:36
 Untitled Samba For Kat Ex 2:18
 Muro Torto 2:45
 Untitled 12:20

References

Zu (band) albums
2003 live albums